Oxyloma retusum, common name the blunt ambersnail, is a species of small land snail, a terrestrial pulmonate gastropod mollusk belonging to the family Succineidae.

Distribution
This species occurs in North America.

Biology
This snail eats dead and green plants in the summer, and only dead plants during the winter.

References

Succineidae
Gastropods described in 1834